The 2003 Italy blackout was a serious power outage that affected all of the Italian Peninsula for 12 hours and part of Switzerland near Geneva for 3 hours on 28 September 2003. It was the largest blackout in the series of blackouts in 2003, involving about 56 million people.

Causes

Power went off at about 03:20 local time on 28 September 2003.  Initial reports from Italy's electricity supplier, GRTN, stated that at the power line which supplied electricity to Italy from Switzerland two trees are falling on the line near the town of Brunnen, causing it to trip; and also that the two 400 kV power lines between France and Italy tripped due to sudden increased demand from those two power lines. Later, it has been shown that the trip of the first line from Switzerland - the so-called "Lukmanier" line - was caused by a tree flashover in Switzerland. The flashover was due to sagging of the conductor as the line was heavily loaded. 

The cascading effect disrupted power flow to Italy from the two main exporting countries France and Switzerland. GRTN lost control of the grid in the next 4 seconds, with the lines to neighbouring countries tripped one by one amid the cascading effect. Swiss electricity company ATEL later concurred that a power line between Switzerland and Italy went out for a few hours.

Frequency dropped down to 49 Hz, due to the loss of import power. Within the next 2.5 minutes, frequency went further down until the under-frequency threshold of 47.5 Hz was hit and all generators were tripped according to the under-frequency protection settings. The reason for the blackout was that during this phase the under-voltage load shedding (UVLS) could not compensate the additional loss of generation, when ca. 7.5 GW of distributed power plants tripped during under-frequency operation (cf. figure "Frequency behavior in Italy in the transitory period", UCTE report, April 2004, p. 115).

Effects

The night of 27 September 2003 is the night of the annual overnight Nuit Blanche in Rome, Thus, many people were on the streets and all public transportation were still operating at the time of the blackout (at about 3:00 on 28 September 2003) despite the fact that it was very late at night. The blackout caused the carnival to end early. Several hundred people were trapped in metro trains. Coupled with heavy rain at the time, many people spent the night sleeping in train stations and on streets in Rome.

Throughout Italy, 110 trains were cancelled, with 30,000 people stranded on trains in the railway network. All flights in Italy were also cancelled. Police described the scene as chaos but there were no serious accidents.

The blackout did not spread further to neighboring countries, such as Austria, Slovenia and Croatia, which are connected to Italy. Only part of the Geneva Canton of Switzerland suffered a power outage for three hours.

Restoration of service

After three hours, energy was restored in northern regions. Electricity was restored gradually in most places, and in most cities electricity was powered on again during the morning. Rolling blackouts continued to affect about 5% of the population on the next two days (29–30 September) as the electricity company GRTN continued its effort to restore supply.

Official report
The final report of the investigation committee on the 28 September 2003 blackout in Italy was published in April 2004 by UCTE.

Scientific research

Researchers in physics and complex networks have modelled the 2003 Italy blackout as a cascade of failures in interdependent networks. Several nodes in the network of power stations failed, causing a failure of the Internet communication network, which in turn caused a further breakdown of power stations. The goal of research was to understand how to build more robust networks.

See also
 Northeast Blackout of 2003
 2015 Turkey blackout
 List of power outages

References

External links
 BBC News Online: Huge blackout cripples Italy
 Official Swiss government report (.pdf, 171 KB) from 01.Nov.2003
 National blackout in Italy (Appledaily Hong Kong) (in Chinese) (requires login if accessing outside of Hong Kong)

Blackout
Italy Blackout, 2003
Italy, 2003
History of the Italian Republic
September 2003 events in Europe
2003 in Italy
2003 in technology